The D-List is the first stand-up comedy special by stand-up comedian Kathy Griffin on Bravo and her third special overall.

Track listing

Personnel

Technical and production
Tom Bull - supervising producer
Scott Butler - producer
Sandy Chanley - executive producer
Keith Truesdell - producer
Grady Cooper - film editor
Stacy Brewster -  production coordinator
John Pritchett - technical director

Visuals and imagery
Cynthia Bachman Brown - makeup department head 
Paul Michael - sound re-recording mixer

References

External links
Kathy Griffin's Official Website

Kathy Griffin albums
Stand-up comedy albums
2004 live albums